Maly Begichev is an island in the Laptev Sea, Russia. Its area is 15 km2.  This small island (maximum length 5.4 km) is situated within the Khatanga Gulf (Russian: Хатангский залив).

Only 8.5 km east of it lies the big island known as Bolshoy Begichev Island. Its size is much larger, with an area of 1764 km sq. The border between administrative divisions of the Russian Federation runs between the two Begichev islands, so that while Maly Begichev is in Krasnoyarsk Krai, Bolshoy Begichev is in the Sakha Republic.

Both islands are named after Russian polar explorer Nikifor Begichev.

References 
 William Barr, The First Soviet Convoy to the Mouth of the Lena.
 

Islands of the Laptev Sea
Islands of Krasnoyarsk Krai